Toy and Plastic Brick Museum is located in Bellaire, Ohio. The museum has been known as "Unofficial LEGO(r) Museum" and "The Plastic Brick Store, INC."  The museum is host to an extensive private collection of LEGO, as well as works by brick artists Jason Burik, Eric Harshbarger, Brian Korte, and Nathan Sawaya.  Toy and Plastic Brick Museum showcases the Guinness Book of World Records "World's largest LEGO image (mosaic) designed by Brian Korte of Brickworkz LLC and built as an installation by museum staff and ~250 children, where it remains for public display.

References

External links
Toy and Plastic Brick Museum

Museums established in 2006
Museums in Belmont County, Ohio
Toy museums in the United States
Art museums and galleries in Ohio
2006 establishments in Ohio